Newnham may refer to:

Places

In England
Newnham, Bedford, an area in the town of Bedford
Newnham, Cambridgeshire
Newnham, Gloucestershire (also known as Newnham on Severn)
Newnham, Hampshire 
Newnham, Hertfordshire
Newnham, Kent
Newnham, Northamptonshire
Newnham Murren, Oxfordshire
Newnham, Warwickshire, in the parish of Aston Cantlow
Newnham Paddox, Warwickshire
Newnham Regis, Warwickshire (also known as King's Newnham) 
Newnham, Worcestershire (also known as Newnham Bridge)
Newnham (Old), Plympton St Mary, Devon
Newnham Park, Plympton St Mary, Devon

In Australia
Newnham, Tasmania

Newnham as an educational establishment:

Newnham College, Cambridge, University of Cambridge, England
Newnham Campus, Seneca College, Ontario, Canada
Newnham Campus, University of Tasmania, Australia

People
Newnham (surname), a list of people